Laurits Møller Jørgensen (December 16, 1896 - September 10, 1976) was a Danish track and field athlete who competed in the 1920 Summer Olympics. In 1920, he finished sixth in the pole vault competition.

References

External links
List of Danish athletes

1896 births
1976 deaths
Danish male pole vaulters
Olympic athletes of Denmark
Athletes (track and field) at the 1920 Summer Olympics